Sur Sangam is a 1985 Indian Hindi-language musical drama film written, and directed by K. Viswanath. It is the Hindi version of Viswanath's classical hit Sankarabharanam.

Cast

Reception

References 

1985 films
1980s Hindi-language films
Films directed by K. Viswanath
Indian musical films
Films about classical music and musicians
Nonlinear narrative films